This is a list of trolley bus systems in Canada by province.  It includes all trolley bus systems, past and present.  Use of boldface for a city name and color highlighting indicates systems that still exist; in the case of Canada, there is only one such system, that of Vancouver.

Alberta

British Columbia

Note:  There was also a demonstration trolley bus line in Victoria in 1945, operated by the British Columbia Electric Railway, from 19 to 30 November 1945.

Manitoba

Nova Scotia

Ontario

Quebec

Saskatchewan

See also

 List of trolley bus systems, for all other countries
 Trolley bus usage by country
 List of street railways in Canada
 List of tram and light rail transit systems
 Lists of rapid transit systems
 Public transport in Canada

Notes

Sources

Books and periodicals
 Murray, Alan. 2000. World Trolleybus Encyclopaedia. Reading,  Berkshire, UK: Trolleybooks.
 Porter, Harry; and Stanley F.X. Worris. 1979. Trolleybus Bulletin No. 109: Databook II.  North American Trackless Trolley Association (defunct).
 Sebree, Mac; and Paul Ward. 1974. The Trolley Coach in  North America (Interurbans Special 59).  Los Angeles, US: Interurbans. LCCN 74-20367.
 Trolleybus Magazine (ISSN 0266-7452). National Trolleybus Association (UK). Bimonthly.

References

Further reading
 Baker, John E. 1982. Winnipeg's Electric Transit: The Story of Winnipeg's Streetcars and Trolley Buses. Toronto, Ontario: Railfare Enterprises Ltd.
 Hatcher, Colin K.; and Tom Schwarzkopf. 1983. Edmonton's Electric Transit: The Story of Edmonton's Streetcars and Trolley Buses.  Toronto, Ontario: Railfare.
 Kelly, Brian; and Daniel Francis. 1990.  Transit in British Columbia: The First Hundred Years. Madeira Park (BC), Canada: Harbour Publishing.
 Leger, Paul A.; and Loring M. Lawrence. 1994. Halifax - City of Trolley Coaches. Windsor, Ontario:  Bus History Association.
 Saitta, Joseph P. Traction Yearbook '81; also '82, '83, '84, '85, '86, '87.  Merrick (NY), US: Traction Slides International.
 Sebree, Mac; and Paul Ward. 1973. Transit's Stepchild, The Trolley Coach (Interurbans Special 58). Los Angeles: Interurbans. LCCN 73-84356.
 Hatcher, Colin K.; and Tom Schwarzkopf. 2009. Calgary's Electric Transit: an illustrated history of electrified public transportation in Canada's oil capital Toronto, Ontario: Railfare.

External links

 All-Time List of North American Trolleybus Systems
 Tom's North American Trolley Bus Pictures
 Bibliography of the Electric Trolleybus (Richard DeArmond)

Canada

Trolleybus